Con Chellis (born Converse A. Chellis IV; November 16, 1978) is an American insurance agent and politician. In 2018, he was elected to the South Carolina House of Representatives, where he served one term.

Early life and education 
Born November 16, 1978 in Charleston, South Carolina, he is the son of Converse Chellis III and Sharon Chellis, and a 2002 graduate of East Tennessee State University in political science. Chellis has served since 2016 on the county council of Dorchester County.

Career 
On October 2, 2017, Chellis he was running for the 94th district seat, representing portions of Charleston and Dorchester counties, as incumbent Katie Arrington had announced that she was running against incumbent Congressman Mark Sanford in the Republican primary. He won the June 2, 2018 primary, with 62.8% of the vote to 31.14% for Evan Guthrie and 6.07% for Glenn Zingarino. On November 6, he won the general election, receiving 8,450 to 4,960 for Democratic nominee Damian Daly (who had also been the Democratic nominee in the 2014 and 2016 races for this seat).

He did not run for re-election in 2020.

Personal life 
On February 21, 2009 he married Tara Lorraine, a chiropractor. They have three children.

References

External links 
official website

1978 births
American businesspeople in insurance
East Tennessee State University alumni
County council members in South Carolina
Living people
Republican Party members of the South Carolina House of Representatives
People from Summerville, South Carolina